Brock Creek is a tributary of Buck Creek, rising in Lower Makefield Township, Bucks County, Pennsylvania, and meets its confluence at Buck Creek's 0.60 river mile in Yardley Borough.

Statistics
Brock Creek was entered into the Geographic Names Information System of the U.S. Geological Survey as identification number 1170304, U.S. Department of the Interior Geological Survey I.D. is 02946.

Course

Municipalities
Bucks County
Lower Makefield Township
Yardley Borough

Crossings and Bridges

See also
List of rivers of Pennsylvania
List of rivers of the United States
List of Delaware River tributaries

References

Rivers of Bucks County, Pennsylvania
Rivers of Pennsylvania
Tributaries of the Delaware River